Camacho is a surname of Spanish, Portuguese or French origin. 
Notable people with the surname include:

 Camacho (wrestler), one of the stage names of Tevita Fifita (born 1983), Tongan-American professional wrestler
 Alejandro Camacho (born 1954), Mexican actor and producer
 Alicia Sánchez-Camacho (born 1967), Spanish politician
 Antonio Camacho García (1926–2017), Spanish politician
 Ariel Camacho (1992–2015), Mexican singer-songwriter
 Art Camacho, American film director, producer, actor and stuntman
 Bruno Camacho (born 1985), Brazilian football (soccer) player
 Byron Camacho (born 1988), Ecuadorian footballer
 Carlos Camacho (1924–1979), Guamanian politician
 Carlos S. Camacho (born 1937), Northern Mariana Islands politician
 Carmen Camacho (born 1939), Filipina  singer
 César Camacho (born 1943), Peruvian-born Brazilian mathematician
 César Camacho Quiroz (born 1959), Mexican lawyer and politician
 Christian Camacho (born 1988), American football (soccer) player
 Daniel Camacho (born 1998), Bolivian football (soccer) player
 Diego Camacho y Ávila (1652–1712), Spanish archbishop
 Diego Camacho (footballer) (born 1976), Spanish football (soccer) player
 Diego Camacho (tennis) (born 1983), Bolivian tennis player
 Eliodoro Camacho (1831–1899), Bolivian politician
 Erika Tatiana Camacho (born 1974), Mexican mathematician and academic
 Ernie Camacho, American baseball player
 Filemón Camacho (1926–2012), Venezuelan middle-distance runner
 Frank Camacho (born 1988), Guamanian mixed martial artist
 Genaro Ruiz Camacho (1954–1998), American drug dealer and organized crime leader
 Germán Camacho (born 1995), Mexican football (soccer) player
 Gregorio Camacho (1933–2002), Venezuelan painter
 Gonzalo Camacho (born 1984), Argentine rugby player
 Guilherme Camacho (born 1990), Brazilian football (soccer) player
 Héctor Camacho ("Macho" Camacho) (1962–2012), Puerto Rican boxer
 Héctor Camacho Jr. (born 1978), Puerto Rican boxer, son of Héctor Camacho
 Ignacio Camacho (born 1990), Spanish football (soccer) player
 Jasmine Camacho-Quinn (born 1996), Puerto Rican track and field athlete
 Javier Camacho (born 1964), Mexican boxer
 Jesse Camacho (born 1991), Canadian actor, son of Mark Camacho
 Jessica Camacho (born 1982), American actress
 Jesús Camacho (born 1998), Mexican squash player
 Jim Camacho, American singer/songwriter 
 João Camacho (born 1994), Portuguese football (soccer) player
 Joaquín Camacho (1766–1816), Neogranadine (Colombian) politician 
 Joe Camacho, Northern Mariana Islands lawyer and politician 
 Joe Camacho (baseball) (1928–2018), American baseball player and coach 
 Jonathan Javier Camacho Riera (born 1985), Venezuelan swimmer 
 Jorge Camacho (painter) (1934–2011), Cuban realist painter 
 Jorge Camacho (writer) (born 1966), Spanish writer in Esperanto and Spanish 
 José Camacho (judoka) (born 1983), Venezuelan judoka 
 José Antonio Camacho (born 1955), Spanish football (soccer) player and manager
 Jose Isidro Camacho (born 1955), Filipino banker and politician 
 Josué Camacho (born 1969), Puerto Rican boxer 
 Juan Camacho (Mexican athlete) (born 1972), Mexican long-distance runner
 Juan Camacho (Bolivian athlete) (born 1959), Bolivian long-distance runner
 Juan Antonio Camacho de Saavedra (1669–1740), master architect of Córdoba, Spain 
 Juan Francisco Camacho (1824–1896), Spanish statesman and financier 
 Juanjo Camacho (born 1980), Spanish football (soccer) player 
 Julian Camacho (born 1943), Filipino sports official 
 Julio César Camacho (born 1978), Venezuelan luger 
 Leevin Camacho, Guamanian lawyer and attorney general 
 Leonardo Camacho (born 1957), Bolivian wrestler 
 Lidia Camacho, Mexican academic and public official
 Luis Camacho (born 1983), Mexican football (soccer) player and manager
 Luis Camacho (dancer), American dancer, choreographer and recording artist
 Luis Fernando Camacho (born 1979), Bolivian activist and politician
 Manuel Ávila Camacho, President of Mexico 1940–1946
 Manuel Camacho (footballer) (1929–2008), Mexican football (soccer) player
 Manuel Camacho Solís (1946–2015), Mexican politician 
 Marcelino Camacho (1918–2010), Spanish trade union leader and politician
 Marcelo Ramiro Camacho (born 1980), Brazilian football (soccer) player
 Mario Camacho (born 1983), Costa Rican football (soccer) player
 Mark Camacho (born 1964), Canadian actor, voice actor and voice director
 Michael Camacho (born 1953), West Indian cricketer
 Nemesio Camacho (1869–1929), Colombian businessman and politician
 Nerea Camacho (born 1996), Spanish actress
 Néstor Camacho (born 1987), Paraguayan football (soccer) player
 Nicol Camacho (born 1999), Colombian football (soccer) player
 Pablo Camacho (born 1990), Venezuelan football (soccer) player
 Paulo Camacho (born 1970), Portuguese swimmer
 Pedro Camacho, Portuguese musical composer
 Pedro Camacho (athlete) (born 1938), Puerto Rican triple jumper
 Rafael Camacho (born 2000), Portuguese football (soccer) player
 Rafael Camacho Guzmán (1916–1998), Mexican trade union leader and politician
 Richard Camacho, Dominican singer-songwriter and dancer
 Rodolfo Camacho (1975–2016), Colombian road cyclist
 Rubén Camacho (born 1953), Mexican road cyclist
 Rudy Camacho (born 1991), French football (soccer) player
 Salvador Camacho (1827–1900), Colombian economist and politician
 Santiago Camacho (born 1997), Argentine football (soccer) player
 Sidronio Camacho, Mexican revolutionary soldier
 Steve Camacho, British West Indian cricketer
 Thelma Camacho, American opera and rock and roll singer
 Vicente Camacho (1929–2016), Northern Mariana Islands politician
 Vicente Camacho y Moya (1886–1943), Mexican Catholic bishop
 Wadi Camacho (born 1985), Spanish-born British boxer
 Washington Camacho (born 1986), Uruguayan football (soccer) player

In fiction
 Camacho, a character in Don Quixote
 President Dwayne Elizondo Mountain Dew Herbert Camacho, a fictional character from the 2006 comedy film Idiocracy
 Lalo Camacho, a fictional character in Third and Indiana

See also
 Camacho, Minas Gerais, a Brazilian municipality
 Camacho (album), the seventh studio album by Pete Murray (Australian singer-songwriter), 2017.
 Camacho River, Bolivia
 Camacho Cigars, a Honduran cigar company
 Eliodoro Camacho Province in Bolivia, named after the politician

Spanish-language surnames
Portuguese-language surnames